Straughn High School is a public school located in the Straughn community near Andalusia in Covington County, Alabama.  It is the largest 9th–12th Grade school in the Covington County Schools (CCS) system. It is classified as a 4-A school in the Alabama High School Athletic Association.
The school was founded in 1886 as Haygood School. 
NCLB Status: Passed AYP

Fine arts
Jazz Band
Concert Band
Marching Band (The Sound of Gold)
String Band
Percussion Ensemble

Athletics
Football
Baseball
Softball
Basketball
Volleyball
Track and Field

Competitive academic teams
Envirobowl
Envirothon
Robotics Team
FFA
JAG
Physics Team

Clubs
National Honor Society
Mu Alpha Theta
FBLA
FCA
Sigma Sci-Science Club
Diamond Dolls
Gridiron Girls
Chess Club
Relay for Life
SGA
String Band
Spanish Club
FFA
FTA
Spanish Club
Drama Club
Lamplighters Club
Peer Helpers

Publications
Yearbook: Tigerama

Notable alumni

References 

 http://www.straughn.cch.schoolinsites.com/?PageName='AboutTheSchool'
 http://www.cov.k12.al.us/Default.asp?L=0&LMID=&PN=Schools2&DivisionID=&DepartmentID=&SubDepartmentID=&SubP=School&SchoolID=2887
 http://nces.ed.gov/ccd/schoolsearch/school_detail.asp?Search=1&ID=010093000363
 http://www.alsde.edu/html/school_detail.asp?syscode=020&schcode=0080

External links
History: http://www.straughn.cch.schoolinsites.com/?PageName='AboutTheSchool'

1886 establishments in Alabama
Educational institutions established in 1886
Public high schools in Alabama
Schools in Covington County, Alabama